Raimo Lehtinen (born 27 February 1946) is a Finnish cross-country skier. He competed in the men's 30 km event at the 1972 Winter Olympics.

Cross-country skiing results

Olympic Games

World Championships

References

External links
 

1946 births
Living people
Finnish male cross-country skiers
Olympic cross-country skiers of Finland
Cross-country skiers at the 1972 Winter Olympics
People from Kauhava
Sportspeople from South Ostrobothnia
20th-century Finnish people